The Coliseum Theatre, or London Coliseum, is a theatre in St Martin's Lane, Westminster, built in 1904.

Coliseum Theatre or Coliseum Theater may also refer to:

Australia
Coliseum Theatre, former name of Independent Theatre, in North Sydney
Sydney Coliseum Theatre, in western Sydney

Malaysia
Coliseum Theatre (Kuala Lumpur)

United Kingdom
Coliseum Theatre (Aberdare), Wales

United States
Coliseum Theatre (Corinth, Mississippi), listed on the National Register of Historic Places, included in Downtown Corinth Historic District
Coliseum Theatre (Washington Heights), in New York City, a former vaudeville theatre built in 1920
Coliseum Theater (Seattle, Washington), a former movie palace now used for retail